= China Worker Net =

Chinese website

- Website type: Left-wing website
- Founded: May 1, 2005
- Dissolved: February 22, 2006
- Website: www.zggr.org

The China Worker Net, or Chinese Workers Website, was a Chinese left-wing website dedicated to the Chinese working class. It was founded in Beijing on May 1, 2005 by a group calling themselves "socialists". The editor-in-chief of the site was Yan Yuanzhang.

China Worker Net (www.zggr.org) claimed to truly represent the workers, peasants, soldiers, and communist ideology. The website made sharp criticisms of laborer and peasant policies.

== Shut down ==
On February 22, 2006, the China Worker Net was ordered to be shut down by the Chinese government.
